Eveningland is the second album by indie folk group Hem.  It was released on Rounder Records after a delay caused by the folding of the DreamWorks music division.  The album features a cover of Johnny Cash's famous song "Jackson," as well as more orchestral arrangements, a change from the sometimes-stark instrumentation of their previous album, Rabbit Songs.

The album features backing vocal contributions from multi-instrumentalist Dawn Landes on a number of songs, and singer-songwriter Josh Rouse on "Carry Me Home."

"Pacific Street" was used in a season 3 episode of Everwood.

Track listing
All songs written by Dan Messé, except where noted.
 "The Fire Thief" - 4:07
 "Lucky" (Messé, Gary Maurer) - 3:49
 "Receiver" - 4:06 
 "Redwing" - 4:14
 "My Father’s Waltz" - 2:10
 "Hollow" (Steve Curtis) - 3:54
 "A-Hunting We Will Go" (Messé, Curtis) - 4:17
 "An Easy One" (Messé, Maurer) - 3:10
 "Strays" - 3:51
 "Cincinnati Traveler" (Curtis) - 1:02
 "Jackson" (Billy Edd Wheeler, Jerry Leiber) - 3:32   
 "Dance with Me" (Curtis) - 3:04
 "The Beautiful Sea" - 2:37
 "Eveningland" - 1:01
 "Pacific Street" - 3:10
 "Carry Me Home" - 5:15

Personnel 
Sally Ellyson - vocals 
Dan Messé - piano, accordion, glockenspiel 
Gary Maurer - guitar, mandolin 
Steve Curtis - guitar, mandolin, banjo, back-up vocals 
Catherine Popper - double bass, back-up vocals
Mark Brotter - drums 
Bob Hoffnar - pedal steel guitar
Heather Zimmerman - violin
Greg Pliska - orchestration

References

2004 albums
Hem (band) albums
Rounder Records albums